Henri Fonfrède (1788 in Bordeaux – 1841) was a French orator, publicist and economist. He made his name as a publicist defending liberal ideas in Bordeaux's main newspaper under the Bourbon Restoration. He was the son of Jean-Baptiste Boyer-Fonfrède.

1788 births
1841 deaths
Politicians from Bordeaux
Orléanists
Members of the 2nd Chamber of Deputies of the July Monarchy
French economists